Carlos Torres Vila may refer to:

 Carlos Torres Vila (musician) (1946–2010), Argentinian folk singer
 Carlos Torres Vila (banker) (born 1966), Spanish banker